The Maroon Washed Flower Moth (Schinia carmosina) is a moth of the family Noctuidae. It is found in central Florida.

It was formerly considered a synonym of Schinia sanguinea.

The wingspan is about 28 mm. There is one generation per year.

The larvae feed on Carphephorus corymbosus and Garberia heterophylla.

External links
Images
The Life History Of Schinia Sanguínea (Geyer)(Noctuidae:Heliothentinae) With A Report On Asurvey For Heterocera In Southwestern Ontario

Schinia
Moths of North America
Moths described in 1883